Apomyelois ehrendorferi is a species of snout moth in the genus Apomyelois. It was described by Malicky and Roesler, in 1970. It is found on Sardinia.

References

Moths described in 1970
Phycitini
Endemic fauna of Italy
Moths of Europe